The Municipality of Lenart is a municipality in northeastern Slovenia. It has just over 11,000 inhabitants. It is considered the centre of the Slovene Hills. The area is part of the traditional region of Styria. It is now included in the Drava Statistical Region. The seat of the municipality is Lenart v Slovenskih Goricah.

Settlements
In addition to the municipal seat of Lenart v Slovenskih Goricah, the municipality also includes the following settlements:

 Črmljenšak
 Dolge Njive
 Gradenšak
 Hrastovec v Slovenskih Goricah
 Lormanje
 Močna
 Nadbišec
 Radehova
 Rogoznica
 Selce
 Šetarova
 Spodnja Voličina
 Spodnje Partinje
 Spodnji Porčič
 Spodnji Žerjavci
 Straže
 Vinička Vas
 Zamarkova
 Zavrh
 Zgornja Voličina
 Zgornji Žerjavci

References

External links

 Municipality of Lenart on Geopedia
 Lenart municipal site

Lenart
1994 establishments in Slovenia